The cult classic television series Twin Peaks has spawned several successful books and audio books due to its popularity. In 1990 and 1991, Pocket Books released three official tie-in books, each authored by the show's creators (or their family) which offer a wealth of backstory. More official tie-in books would be released in 2016 and 2017, written by Mark Frost.

Official releases
There are six novels based on Twin Peaks which have been released in book and/or audio book format and are written by authors involved with the series. These books are intended to be canon to the franchise and expand upon the storylines portrayed in the series and film; they do contain some continuity errors and contradictions, however - some of which may be intentional.

Unofficial releases
Below is a partial list of books relating to Twin Peaks by authors not involved with the franchise. These are not considered canon or part of the franchise. 

 Twin Peaks Behind-the-scenes: An Unofficial Visitors Guide to Twin Peaks, 1991. Written by Mark Altman.

Welcome To Twin Peaks, 1990. Written by Scott Knickelbine. A Complete Guide to Who's Who and What's What. This book was unauthorized and was later pulled from the shelves.

A Twin Peaks Interpretation, 1992. Written by Patricia Shook. "A 90's person's view of the Twin Peaks television series".

 Full of Secrets: Critical Approaches to Twin Peaks(), 1995. Edited by David Lavery. "Full of Secrets" contains a collection of essays considering David Lynch's politics, the musical score, and the show's cult status, treatment of family violence, obsession with doubling, and silencing of women. Also included are a director and writer list, a cast list, a "Twin Peaks" calendar, a complete scene breakdown for the entire series, and a comprehensive bibliography. Essays include: "Lynching Women: A Feminist Reading of Twin Peaks", "Family Romance, Family Violence, and the Fantastic in Twin Peaks", "Infinite Games: The Derationalization of Detection in Twin Peaks", "Desire Under the Douglas Firs: Entering the Body of Reality in Twin Peaks", "The Canonization of Laura Palmer".
 Reflections: An Oral History of Twin Peaks, 2014. Written by Brad Dukes. "Reflections: An Oral History of Twin Peaks examines David Lynch and Mark Frost’s legendary television series that aired on the ABC network from 1990-91. As the mystery of “Who Killed Laura Palmer?” played out on television sets across the world, another compelling drama was unfolding in the everyday lives of the show’s cast and crew. Twenty-five years later, Reflections goes behind the curtain of Twin Peaks and documents the series’ unlikely beginnings, widespread success, and peculiar collapse. Featuring first-hand accounts from series cocreator Mark Frost and cast members including Kyle MacLachlan, Joan Chen, Sherilyn Fenn, Piper Laurie, Michael Ontkean, Ray Wise, Billy Zane, and many more – Reflections explores the magic and mystique of a true television phenomenon, Twin Peaks."

Wrapped in Plastic: Twin Peaks, 2015. Written by Andy Burns. In Wrapped in Plastic, pop culture writer Andy Burns uncovers and explores the groundbreaking stylistic and storytelling methods that have made the series one of the most influential and enduring shows of the past 25 years. Andy Burns is the founder and editor-in-chief of the pop culture website Biff Bam Pop. In 2014, he interviewed various Twin Peaks alumni for both his book and the cover story to the March issue of Rue Morgue magazine, including Sheryl Lee, Ray Wise, Kimmy Robertson, James Marshall, Dana Ashbrook, Harley Peyton, Robert Engles, Jennifer Lynch, Ian Buchanan, and Michael J Anderson.

TV Peaks: Twin Peaks and Modern Television Drama, 2015. Written by Andreas Halskov. "TV Peaks" is a TV historical book that explores the last 25 years of American and Scandinavian television. "TV Peaks" argues that Twin Peaks was a game changer, pointing to a more transgressive, genre-bending and serialized type of TV drama, but the book also explores structural, industrial, systemic and sociological factors. Based on interviews with numerous TV scholars, fans and cast and crew members (e.g. David Lynch, Angelo Badalamenti, Lesli Linka Glatter, Caleb Deschanel, Duwayne Dunham, Frank Byers, Dana Ashbrook, Sherilyn Fenn, Richard Beymer and Jonathan P. Shaw), "TV Peaks" investigates the recent changes in television, and it combines fandom studies, textual analysis and television history.

 Twin Peaks FAQ: All That's Left to Know About a Place Both Wonderful and Strange, 2016. Written by David Bushman and Arthur Smith. Paley Center for Media curators David Bushman and Arthur Smith guide longtime fans and the newly initiated through the labyrinthian world of the television series and the theatrical film Fire Walk with Me, delving deep into the rich mythology that made Twin Peaks a cultural phenomenon. The book features detailed episode guides, character breakdowns, and explorations of the show's distinctive music, fashion, and locations.

 The Essential Wrapped In Plastic: Pathways to Twin Peaks, 2016. Written by John Thorne. The Essential Wrapped In Plastic: Pathways to Twin Peaks collects many of the important essays and interviews from Wrapped In Plastic magazine, which, for thirteen years, studied Twin Peaks and its follow-up feature film, Fire Walk With Me. The book examines each episode of Twin Peaks; it provides analysis of original scripts, and observations from cast and crew (including comments from series co-creators David Lynch and Mark Frost, and cast members such as Sheryl Lee, James Marshall, Dana Ashbrook, Catherine Coulson, Miguel Ferrer, Frank Silva, Don Davis, Jack Nance, Everett McGill, Heather Graham, Michael J Anderson and many more.) In depth essays and commentary about Fire Walk With Me are also included.
Laura's Ghost: Women Speak about Twin Peaks, 2020. Written by Courtenay Stallings. Laura's Ghost contains interviews with and essays from female fans of the show and women involved in its production including Sheryl Lee, Grace Zabriskie, and Jennifer Lynch. It examines the role of Laura Palmer in pop culture and her lasting impact on fans of the show.

See also
 List of television series made into books

References

 
Twin Peaks